The Busan Biennale is a biannual international contemporary art show held in Busan, South Korea. Busan Biennale is held in even-numbered years, and is hosted by Busan metropolitan city and Busan Biennale Organizing Committee.

Exhibition history 
The Busan Biennale is a biannual international contemporary art show that integrated three different art events held in the city in 1998: the Busan Youth Biennale, the first Biennale of Korea that was voluntarily organized by local artists in 1981; the Sea Art Festival, an environmental art festival launched in 1987 with the sea serving as a backdrop; and the Busan Outdoor Sculpture Symposium that was first held in 1991. The Biennale was previously called the Pusan International Contemporary Art Festival (PICAF) before it launched.

Furthermore, rather than simply adhere to the white cube but chose unexpected places including culturally backward regions and old industry facilities as exhibition halls, Busan Biennale illuminates Busan city and contributes balanced development within Busan.

In the example at the top, KISWIRE Suyeong factory (it is called ‘F1963’ currently) being used for special exhibition hall and main exhibition hall for Busan Biennale 2014 and Busan Biennale 2016 respectively. As of today, F1963 branded itself as one of the most famous culture complexes in Busan. Also, it is considered as a model case of urban regeneration.

From October 16, 2021, the "2021 Sea Art Festival" will be held at Ilgwang Beach in Gijang-gun for 30 days. In the 2021 exhibition, led by Indian director Ritika Biswas, more than 20 artists from home and abroad will participate in the production and programming in cooperation with institutions and organizations in various fields.

References

External links 
  

Art biennials
Culture of Busan
Recurring events established in 1998
1998 establishments in South Korea